Wiwek Mahabali, better known mononymously as Wiwek, is a Dutch DJ and music producer based in Utrecht, Netherlands.

Early life 
Wiwek was born in the Netherlands and is of Indian descent. His father is an Indian musician and singer. His stage name was suggested by Gregor Salto that he use his given name for his musical career.

Background 
Wiwek is best known as the pioneer of, and his contributions to "jungle terror", a hybrid style of dance music characterized by offbeat kick drums, dissonant lead synths, and tribal drum and chant samples. His music has been released on such labels as Barong Family and Owsla, and led to collaborations with Skrillex and Yellow Claw. He is also the label head of his own jungle terror-based label Rimbu Recordings. He gained popularity in dance music and was known for 'fusing electronic elements with tropical rhythms'. He is regarded as the "Godfather of jungle terror".

Jungle terror was first created when Wiwek was playing and explaining his music to his friends. He then uploaded some songs to SoundCloud with the 'jungle terror' tag which eventually became popular.

Career

2014: Mad Decent 
In 2014, Wiwek was signed to Diplo's Mad Decent record label as an artist. He collaborated with Gregor Salto to release the single "On Your Mark".

2015: OWSLA 
American dubstep DJ Skrillex had announced the signing of Wiwek to his record label "Owsla". Wiwek performed at the 2015 Ultra Music Festival in Miami. He had also hosted an episode on Tiësto's record label, Musical Freedom's radio show. He collaborated with Hardwell to release the single titled "Chameleon". On 28 April 2015, he released "Fire" as a single collaborating with Dutch DJ Alvaro via Steve Aoki's record label, Dim Mak Records. In November 2015, he collaborated with GTA to release "What We Tell Dem" as a single.

2016-2019: Collaboration with Skrillex, Marshmello and debut album Cycles
On 19 February 2016, he collaborated with Dutch DJs Yellow Claw to release "Pop It" as a single. His OWSLA-debut extended play consisting of five songs, "The Free and Rebellious" which incorporates elements of drum and bass, was released a week later. The EP had received poor ratings in a review with only 1.5 star was given out of five.

Most recently, Wiwek's The Free and Rebellious EP was used as the soundtrack and score to the short film Still in the Cage which was filmed in Bangkok, Thailand, written and directed by Canadian filmmaker Jodeb and produced by Wiwek and Skrillex. The short film included Wiwek's collaboration with Skrillex "Killa". It was premiered on 17 August at the theater at Ace Hotel Downtown Los Angeles. An official music video for "Killa", directed by Jonathan Desbiens was uploaded by Skrillex to YouTube. The single "Killa" features vocals from Swedish vocalist Elliphant. American trap producer Slushii, Boombox Cartel and Henry Fong have released remixes of the song.

He released his debut album, Cycles on 8 March 2019 through his record label Maha Vana. He was also featured in a track "Angklung Life" with American DJ Marshmello on the album Joytime III.

Discography

Albums

Compilation albums

Extended plays

Singles

Remixes

2013
 Moska – Sick Kick (Wiwek Remix) [Mad Decent]

2014 
 Yellow Claw featuring Rochelle – Shotgun (Wiwek Remix) [SPRS]
 Leftside – Monkey Biznizz (Wiwek Remix) [Mad Decent]
 Yellow Claw featuring Lil Eddie – Never Dies (Wiwek Remix) [Mad Decent]

2015 
 Katy Tiz – Whistle (While You Work It) (Wiwek Remix) [Atlantic Records]
 Gregor Salto – Afrobot (Wiwek Remix) [DOORN Records]
 Etnik featuring Mykki Blanco – Unclassified (Wiwek Remix) [OWSLA]
 Martin Solveig & GTA – Intoxicated (Wiwek Remix) [Spinnin' Remixes]
 Sauti Sol – Sura Yako (Wiwek Remix)
 Cash Cash featuring BOB, Busta Rhymes & Neon Hitch – Devil (Wiwek Remix) [BIG BEAT]

2016 
 Firebeatz and Chocolate Puma featuring BISHØP – Lullaby (Wiwek Remix) [Spinnin' Remixes]
 Getter – Rip N Dip (Wiwek Remix) [OWSLA]
 Skrillex and Diplo featuring Kai – Mind (Wiwek Remix) [OWSLA / Mad Decent]

2017 
 A R I Z O N A – Oceans Away (Wiwek Remix) [Atlantic Records] 
 Bro Safari, Dillon Francis & Salvatore Ganacci – XL (Wiwek Remix) [Bro Safari Music]
 Mike Cervello – Moodswing (Wiwek Remix) [Barong Family]
 Axwell Λ Ingrosso - More Than You Know (Wiwek Remix) [Virgin EMI]

2019 
 Kiwi - Witch's Lesson (Wiwek Remix)

References

Notes
 A  Did not enter the Ultratop 50, but peaked on the Dance chart.

Sources

External links
 
 Beatport

Living people
Remixers
Dutch record producers
Dutch DJs
Owsla artists
Year of birth missing (living people)
Dutch people of Indian descent